Rochelle Anne Stormont (born July 21, 1982, in Pukekohe, Auckland) is a New Zealand judoka who competed in the women's half-lightweight category. She held five New Zealand senior titles in her division between 1997 and 2004, picked up a total of seven medals in her career, and represented her nation New Zealand in the 52-kg class at the 2004 Summer Olympics.

Stormont qualified as a lone judoka for the New Zealand squad in the women's half-lightweight class (52 kg) at the 2004 Summer Olympics in Athens, by topping the field and granting a berth from the Oceania Championships in Noumea, New Caledonia. She lost her opening match to Romania's highly ranked judoka Ioana Maria Aluaş, who scored an ippon victory and quickly subdued her on the tatami with an ura nage (rear throw) at thirty-four seconds.

References

External links

1982 births
Living people
New Zealand female judoka
Olympic judoka of New Zealand
Judoka at the 2004 Summer Olympics
People from Pukekohe